Alan Hepple (born August 16, 1963) is a Canadian former professional ice hockey defenceman, and is one of a few people from England to play in the National Hockey League.

Playing career
Selected 169th overall by the New Jersey Devils in the 1982 NHL Entry Draft, he played three NHL games for the Devils over three seasons between 1983 and 1986, scoring no points and registering seven penalties in minutes.  His minor league career was played between 1983 and 1993 with the Maine Mariners, Utica Devils and Newmarket Saints of the American Hockey League and the San Diego Gulls and Cincinnati Cyclones of the International Hockey League.

Post-playing career
Hepple remained within professional hockey, joining the Nashville Predators organization as a scout from 1997 to 2002 before joining the Colorado Avalanche as a scout for the 2002–03 season. After 7 seasons as a scout, Hepple was promoted to assistant Director of Amateur scouting with the Avalanche, serving in the role for a further six seasons before he was named the Director of Amateur Scouting with Colorado prior to the 2015–16 season.

Hepple was not renewed in his role with Avalanche following his sixth season as Director of Amateur Scouting, and left the organization after 19 years. He was later announced to have joined the Arizona Coyotes front office, assuming the role as Director of Professional Scouting prior to the 2021 NHL Entry Draft.

Career statistics

See also
List of National Hockey League players from the United Kingdom

References

External links

1963 births
Living people
Canadian ice hockey defencemen
Cincinnati Cyclones (IHL) players
Colorado Avalanche scouts
Ice hockey people from Ontario
Maine Mariners players
Nashville Predators scouts
New Jersey Devils draft picks
New Jersey Devils players
Newmarket Saints players
Ottawa 67's players
Sportspeople from Owen Sound
San Diego Gulls (IHL) players
Utica Devils players